The 2012 United States presidential election in South Dakota took place on November 6, 2012, as part of the 2012 United States presidential election in which all 50 states plus the District of Columbia participated. South Dakota voters chose three electors to represent them in the Electoral College via a popular vote pitting incumbent Democratic President Barack Obama and his running mate, Vice President Joe Biden, against Republican challenger and former Massachusetts Governor Mitt Romney and his running mate, Congressman Paul Ryan. 

Prior to the election, all seventeen news organizations making predictions for the election considered this a state Romney would win, or otherwise considered as a safe red state. South Dakota has not voted for a Democratic presidential nominee since Lyndon B. Johnson carried it in his 44-state landslide in 1964. South Dakota, just as all of the other states in the Great Plains, is among the most Republican states in the country. According to a 2012 Gallup poll, South Dakota is the 9th most conservative state in the country, with Republicans having an 11 percentage point advantage over Democrats in terms of party affiliation or identification. It is also the 10th whitest state in the country as of 2012, at 83.8%, and has the 4th highest gun ownership rate in the country at 56.6%, according to The Washington Post. Both of these voting blocs are relatively solid for the Republican Party. 

While Obama lost the state by only 8.41% in 2008, illustrating a potential resurgence of Democratic strength among the agrarian population as seen in states such as Iowa, the state was returned to the safe Republican column in 2012. Romney won South Dakota by an 18.02% margin of victory. Romney was able to win back southeast Dakota: Obama became competitive there in 2008, when he won Minnehaha County (and many of its suburbs), home to the state's largest city of Sioux Falls, by only 587 votes. Romney carried upwards of 60% of the vote in many counties, with his best performance in the West River. He also flipped Brown County, where Aberdeen is.

Obama's best performance was in majority Native American counties in the west of the state. He carried 93.35% of the vote in Shannon County (now known as Oglala Lakota), home to the Pine Ridge Reservation and the Oglala Lakota tribe. The counties of Buffalo; Dewey; and Todd, where the Crow Creek; Cheyenne River and Standing Rock; and Rosebud reservations are located, respectively, also delivered great margins to the president. Clay County, home to the University of South Dakota, was the only county in the southeast to vote for Obama.

As of 2020, this is the most recent election in which the Democratic candidate won Corson County, Day County, Marshall County, and Roberts County.

Primaries

Democratic

Republican

The Republican primary took place on June 5, 2012. 25 delegates will be chosen, for a total of 28 delegates to go to the national convention.

General election

Results

Results by county

Counties that flipped from Democratic to Republican
 Brookings (largest city: Brookings)
 Brown (largest city: Aberdeen)
 Lake (largest city: Madison)
 Miner (largest city: Howard)
 Minnehaha (largest city: Sioux Falls)
 Moody (largest city: Flandreau)

By congressional district
South Dakota has only one congressional district because of its small population compared to other states. This district, called the At-Large district because it covers the entire state, is equivalent to the statewide election results.

See also
 United States presidential elections in South Dakota
 2012 Republican Party presidential debates and forums
 2012 Republican Party presidential primaries
 Results of the 2012 Republican Party presidential primaries
 South Dakota Republican Party

References

External links
The Green Papers: for South Dakota
The Green Papers: Major state elections in chronological order

2012
United States President
South Dakota